"Tabloid Magazine" is a song by Australian punk rock band The Living End. It was released in February 2004, as the second single from their third album, Modern ARTillery. The song spent 4 weeks in the Australian ARIA Singles Charts and peaked at No. 57. It appeared at No 66 on Triple J's Hottest 100 poll for 2003.

It features a live version of the classic "All Torn Down", plus acoustic versions of "Who's Gonna Save Us?" and "What Would You Do?" and a previously unreleased track, "No Reaction".

On the title track frontman Chris Cheney writes, "I have a weak spot for these mags. I am fascinated at the social preoccupation with reading about other people’s lives. They lure you in and become difficult to put down. I think it has a new wave kinda edge".

The video was directed by Todd Sheldrick, and filmed in Sydney during the band's national Modern ARTillery tour in 2003.

Track listing

Personnel
Band members
Chris Cheney – vocals, guitar
Andy Strachan – drums
Scott Owen – double bass, backing vocals

Recording process
 Producer – Mark Trombino 
 Engineer – Mark Tromino
 Assistant engineer – Dean Nelson, Jason Cupp 
 Mastering – Brian Gardner
 Mixing – Mark Trombino
 Studios – Ocean Studios, Burbank, California
 Mixing studios – Extasy South, Hollywood, California

Artwork
 Art direction – Richard Goodheart
 Photography – Matthew Welch

Charts

Release history

References

2004 singles
The Living End songs
2003 songs
EMI Records singles
Songs written by Chris Cheney